The  is a rapid transit line serving Yokohama in Kanagawa Prefecture, Japan. It is the shorter of the two lines in the Yokohama Municipal Subway system operated by Yokohama City Transportation Bureau. Its formal designation is Line 4, and it is the first section to be opened of a proposed .

Construction began in 2001 and the new line started operating on 30 March 2008. It uses linear motor propulsion and a full journey takes approximately 21 minutes one way.

Stations 
Platforms are above ground at Kawawachō, Center-Kita, and Center-Minami stations and underground at other stations.

Rolling stock 

The Green Line is operated by 17 4-car 10000 series EMUs. In 2018, it was announced that 10 of these would be lengthened to six cars each by 2024 as a measure to ease overcrowding on the Green Line. The first lengthened trainset is expected to enter revenue service on 24 September 2022.

References 
 Japan Railfan Magazine, January 2008 issue (Vol 48, No. 561), p62-63

External links 
City subway official website (in Japanese)

Yokohama Municipal Subway
Lines of Yokohama City Transportation Bureau
Linear motor metros
Railway lines opened in 2008
 
2008 establishments in Japan